Euzebya tangerina  is a Gram-positive bacterium from the genus Euzebya which has been isolated from the sea cucumber Holothuria edulis from the coast of Japan.

References

External links
Type strain of Euzebya tangerina at BacDive -  the Bacterial Diversity Metadatabase

 

Actinomycetota
Bacteria described in 2010